The Silver Line was a shipping company formed in 1908, part of the British Merchant Navy. By the 1930s they were offering round the world passenger/cargo services, with the passenger fare on a freighter £100. Entirely on foreign service, the ships did not include UK ports of call.  Managing owners were the S & J Thompson family.  Most of their merchant ships bore the name Silver followed by the name of a tree. The Second World War claimed 11 of their ships. One of them, the Silverfir, was sunk by the German battleship  on a voyage from Manchester to New York in 1941. Silver Line switched to tramping around the world in the 1950s, then went through several ownership changes, and by 1985, with the sale of their last ship, was no more.

The Silverplane, a sleek twin funnel vessel of 7,226 gross tons built in 1948, was sold to the Cunard Line in 1951 and renamed Alsatia II, and so was her sister ship Silverbriar, to become Andria I. Their forward funnels were false, containing the chart room and the captain's cabin, looked like miniature s, and carried just 12 passengers, the maximum allowed without a regulation onboard doctor. They were sold to the Republic of China and renamed Union Freedom and Union Faith respectively. The latter ship was demolished in a fiery collision with an oil barge outside New Orleans in 1969, with considerable loss of life.

An associated company, Joseph L. Thompson & Sons of Sunderland, was involved in the design of the first Liberty ships that saw service in World War II and beyond.

During the 1970s, Silver Line had a fleet of chemical tankers carrying many types of (often hazardous) cargoes; from sulphuric acid to tetraethyllead.  These ships often traded in the Baltic region.  They were usually called Silver- plus the name of a bird of prey (e.g. Silvermerlin, Silverosprey, etc.).  Promotion on these ships could be very rapid for those officers prepared to serve regularly on them.  Captains of 25 years of age were not uncommon.

The company also had bulk carriers, tankers, OBOs and general cargo ships.  The Silvermain and Silverfjord were on a regular run between Japan and the US, carrying grain one way and Toyota cars the other.

Ships

See also
 Barges
 British Merchant Navy
 Cargo ship
 J.L. Thompson and Sons
 Liberty Ship
 Richardsons Westgarth & Company
 Ship transport
 Swan Hunter & Wigham Richardson, Ltd.
 William Doxford & Sons
 United States Merchant Marine
 Victory ship

References

External links
 NTSB Report of Union Faith (ex Silverbriar) collision in Mississippi River, 6 April 1969
 Oil recovery from wreck after 32 years
 Silver Line history and full fleet
 Sinking of Silverpalm
 Maritime images and sailing lists
 Gallery of typical Tramps & Liberty Ships
 Seafarers International Union, Liberty Ships, and the Sunderland connection
 Thompson family history

Defunct shipping companies of the United Kingdom